Patrick Lihanda (born 11 April 1962) is a Ugandan boxer. He competed at the 1984 Summer Olympics and the 1988 Summer Olympics.

References

1962 births
Living people
Ugandan male boxers
Olympic boxers of Uganda
Boxers at the 1984 Summer Olympics
Boxers at the 1988 Summer Olympics
African Games gold medalists for Uganda
African Games medalists in boxing
Place of birth missing (living people)
Competitors at the 1987 All-Africa Games
Middleweight boxers